Krasnoyarsky is a rural locality (a settlement) and the administrative center of Krasnoyarskoye Rural Settlement, Chernyshkovsky District, Volgograd Oblast, Russia. The population was 750 as of 2010. There are 13 streets.

Geography 
Krasnoyarsky is located 6 km southeast of Chernyshkovsky (the district's administrative centre) by road. Chernyshkovsky is the nearest rural locality.

References 

Rural localities in Chernyshkovsky District